The long-tailed whip snake (Demansia flagellatio), also known as the Carpentarian whipsnake, is a species of venomous snake in the family Elapidae.

References

Demansia
Snakes of Australia
Reptiles described in 1985
Reptiles of Queensland